Giulio Pontedera (7 May 1688 – 3 September 1757) was an Italian botanist of Tuscan origin. He was professor of botany at Padua, and director of the botanical garden there. Although he rejected Carl Linnaeus' system, Linnaeus was a correspondent of Pontedera's, and named the genus Pontederia after him.

References

Works
 

1688 births
1757 deaths
18th-century Italian botanists
People of Tuscan descent